Fürstenberg-Geisingen was a county in southern Baden-Württemberg, Germany during the Middle Ages. A partition of Fürstenberg-Fürstenberg, it was inherited by the Counts of Fürstenberg-Baar in 1483.

Counts of Fürstenberg-Geisingen (1441 - 1483)
John VI (1441 - 1443)
Egon VI (1443 - 1483)

Fürstenberg (princely family)
Counties of the Holy Roman Empire
States and territories established in 1441